This is a list of 122 species in the genus Metamasius, bromeliad weevils.

Metamasius species

 Metamasius alterans Hustache, 1936 c
 Metamasius alveolus Vaurie, 1968 c
 Metamasius ambiguus Csiki, E., 1936 c
 Metamasius amplicollis Hustache, 1936 c
 Metamasius annulatus Vaurie, 1967 c
 Metamasius applicatus Hustache, 1938 c
 Metamasius atwoodi Anderson, 2002 i g
 Metamasius aurocinctus Vaurie, 1967 c
 Metamasius barbatulus Vaurie, 1968 c
 Metamasius basilaris Vaurie, 1967 c
 Metamasius bellorum Anderson, 2002 i g
 Metamasius benoisti Hustache, 1936 c
 Metamasius bigeminatus Champion, 1910 c
 Metamasius biguttatus Champion, 1910 c
 Metamasius bilobus Hustache, 1936 c
 Metamasius bisignatus Hustache, 1932 c
 Metamasius bolivari Vaurie, 1967 c
 Metamasius brevinasus Hustache, 1936 c
 Metamasius bromeliadicola Champion, 1913 c
 Metamasius bruneri Buchanan, 1942 c
 Metamasius burcheri Anderson, 2002 i g
 Metamasius callizona Champion, G.C., 1910 c b  (Mexican bromeliad weevil)
 Metamasius carbonarius Champion, G.C., 1910 c
 Metamasius carinipyga Vaurie, 1967 c
 Metamasius cerasinus Vaurie, 1967 c
 Metamasius ciliatus Vaurie, 1967 c
 Metamasius cincinnatus Champion, 1910 c
 Metamasius cinnamomeus Gemminger, M. & Harold, E. von q., 1871 c
 Metamasius cinnamominus Champion, G.C., 1910 c
 Metamasius circumdatus Vaurie, 1967 c
 Metamasius circumjectus Vaurie, 1967 c
 Metamasius condylus Vaurie, 1967 c
 Metamasius conicicollis Hustache, 1936 c
 Metamasius connexus Champion, 1910 c
 Metamasius consimilis Voss, 1954 c
 Metamasius consularis Günther, 1941 c
 Metamasius crinitus Vaurie, 1971 c
 Metamasius crustosus Vaurie, 1967 c
 Metamasius dasycnemis Günther, 1936 c
 Metamasius dasyurus Champion, 1910 c
 Metamasius decoratus Csiki, E., 1936 c
 Metamasius dentirostris Hustache, 1936 c
 Metamasius difficilis Günther, 1941 c
 Metamasius dimidiatipennis Champion, G.C., 1910 c
 Metamasius dimidiatus Csiki, E., 1936 c
 Metamasius dispar Gyllenhal, L. in Schönherr, C.J., 1838 c
 Metamasius distorta Günther, 1941 c
 Metamasius duplocinctus Vaurie, 1967 c
 Metamasius elegantulus Hustache, 1936 c
 Metamasius ensirostris Champion, G.C., 1910 c
 Metamasius fasciatus Champion, G.C., 1910 c
 Metamasius foveolatus Vaurie, 1967 c
 Metamasius fractelineatus Hustache, 1936 c
 Metamasius gallettae Anderson, 2002 i g
 Metamasius graphipterus Vaurie, 1967 c
 Metamasius guentheri Vaurie, 1967 c
 Metamasius hebetatus Champion, 1910 c
 Metamasius hemipterus Champion, G.C., 1910 c b  (silky cane weevil)
 Metamasius hooveri Anderson, 2002 i g
 Metamasius hoppi Voss, 1954 c
 Metamasius illusionis Vaurie, 1968 c
 Metamasius imitator Vaurie, 1967 c
 Metamasius incisus Vaurie, 1967 c
 Metamasius inscriptus Csiki, E., 1936 c
 Metamasius laticrus Vaurie, 1967 c
 Metamasius leopardinus Anderson, 2002 i g
 Metamasius limulus Vaurie, 1967 c
 Metamasius lyratus Günther, 1941 c
 Metamasius maculiventris Champion, 1910 c
 Metamasius melancholicus Champion, G.C., 1910 c
 Metamasius mesomelas Vaurie, 1967 c
 Metamasius monilis Vaurie, 1967 c
 Metamasius mosieri Barber, 1920 i c b
 Metamasius murdiei Anderson, 2002 i g
 Metamasius nigerrimus Csiki, E., 1936 c
 Metamasius nigromaculatus Voss, 1954 c
 Metamasius nudiventris Champion, 1910 c
 Metamasius obsoletus Champion, G.C., 1936 c
 Metamasius ochreofasciatus Champion, 1910 c
 Metamasius octonotatus Champion, 1910 c
 Metamasius ornatus Vaurie, 1967 c
 Metamasius pallisteri Vaurie, 1967 c
 Metamasius personatus Vaurie, 1967 c
 Metamasius peruanus Hustache, 1936 c
 Metamasius planatus Anderson, 2013 c g
 Metamasius polygrammus Champion, G.C., 1910 c
 Metamasius pruinosus Vaurie, 1967 c
 Metamasius puncticeps Hustache, 1936 c
 Metamasius purpurascens (Panzer, G.W.F., 1798) c g
 Metamasius pygidialis Günther, 1935 c
 Metamasius quadrilineatus Champion, 1910 c
 Metamasius quadrisignatus Csiki, E., 1936 c
 Metamasius rectistriatus Vaurie, 1967 c
 Metamasius richdeboeri Anderson, 2002 i g
 Metamasius rimoratus Csiki, E., 1936 c
 Metamasius ritchiei Marshall, 1916 c
 Metamasius rubetra (Olivier, 1790) g
 Metamasius rufofasciatus Csiki, E., 1936 c
 Metamasius sacchari Csiki, E., 1936 c
 Metamasius saecularis Janczyk, 1976 c
 Metamasius scutatus Champion, 1910 c
 Metamasius scutellatus Hustache, 1936 c
 Metamasius scutiger Champion, 1910 c
 Metamasius sellatus Champion, 1910 c
 Metamasius semirubripes Hustache, 1936 c
 Metamasius sericeus Kuschel, 1956 c
 Metamasius shchepaneki Anderson, 2002 i g
 Metamasius signiventris Kirsch, T., 1888-89 c
 Metamasius sinuatus Vaurie, 1967 c
 Metamasius spinolae (Gyllenhal, 1838) i
 Metamasius spurius Vaurie, 1967 c
 Metamasius submaculatus Champion, G.C., 1910 c
 Metamasius sulcirostris Champion, 1910 c
 Metamasius tectus Vaurie, 1967 c
 Metamasius touroulti Rheinheimer, 2015 g
 Metamasius tuberculipectus Hustache, 1936 c
 Metamasius variegatus Csiki, E., 1936 c
 Metamasius vaurieae Anderson, 2002 i g
 Metamasius vicarius Vaurie, 1967 c
 Metamasius vicinus Hustache, 1936 c
 Metamasius wolfensohni Anderson, 2002 i g
 Metamasius yunquensis Vaurie, 1967 c

Data sources: i = ITIS, c = Catalogue of Life, g = GBIF, b = Bugguide.net

References

Metamasius
Articles created by Qbugbot